The 2008 Lexus Cup was a professional women's golf event contested by two teams of 12 members each: one representing Asian countries and the other representing the rest of the world, known as the "International" team. Since the event's inception in 2005, it has been sanctioned by the world's dominant women's professional golf tour, the LPGA Tour in the U.S., although it is an unofficial event in which no earnings by the competitors affect their positions on the LPGA money list.

The competition took place on the Bukit Course at The Singapore Island Country Club in Singapore from 28 to 30 November 2008. Lexus was the title sponsor; Rolex, DBS, Singapore Airlines, Callaway Golf, and Singapore Sports Council were main sponsors.

This was the last official LPGA appearance for Team International captain Annika Sörenstam, who had previously announced her retirement at the end of the 2008 season.

Teams
As in the similar team events of the Solheim Cup (USA vs. Europe women), Ryder Cup (USA vs. Europe men), and Presidents Cup, each team is made up of twelve players. Four players for Team Asia and four for Team International earn sports through the Rolex Rankings. Four additional players for each team qualified through their position on the LPGA Official Money List, as of 2 November 2008. Once the top eight players for each team were confirmed, four additional players—two captain's picks and two sponsor's exemptions—were selected for each team.

Asia
Rolex World Ranking Qualification
 Yani Tseng
 Seon Hwa Lee
 Jeong Jang
 Eun-Hee Ji
ADT Official Money List Qualification
 Inbee Park
 Na Yeon Choi
 Song-Hee Kim
 Candie Kung
Captain's Picks
 Sarah Lee
 Mayumi Shimomura
Sponsor's Picks
 Namika Omata
 Se Ri Pak (playing captain)

International
Rolex World Rankings Qualifications
 Annika Sörenstam (playing captain)
 Suzann Pettersen
 Paula Creamer
 Cristie Kerr
ADT Official Money List Qualification
 Helen Alfredsson
 Angela Stanford
 Katherine Hull
 Karen Stupples
Captain's Picks
 Nicole Castrale
 Natalie Gulbis
Sponsor's Picks
 Nikki Campbell
 Christina Kim

Day one
28 November 2008

Day one saw six foursome matches with each team putting two golfers on the course for each match and the pairs playing alternate shots. The teams split the matches with each team winning three. Only one of the six matches — Paula Creamer and Nicole Castrale vs. Se Ri Pak and Eun-Hee Ji — went to 18 holes.

Day two
29 November 2008

The teams remained locked in tie after the day two fourball matches where each side won three matches. All of the wins by the International Team went to 18 holes, compared to only one of the wins by Team Asia.

Day three
30 November 2008

External links
Lexus Cup - official site

Lexus Cup
Golf tournaments in Singapore
Lexus Cup
Lexus Cup